WPOK was a daytime-only AM broadcasting station in Pontiac, Illinois in the late 20th century.  Owned by Collins Miller and Lane Lindstrom, it went on the air on August 1, 1966.  In 1975 it was running a middle of the road (music) format, simulcast on its FM sister station 103.1 WPOK-FM.  The FM changed its callsign to WJEZ in November 1984, and by 1989 AM and FM had separate formats: 1080 WPOK with oldies and 103.1 WJEZ with modern country music.

WPOK was silent by March 1998, last having an adult standards format.  It surrendered its license on 24 March 1998 during its renewal process, and was deleted on 18 June 1998. The station's license was surrendered so that WNWI AM 1080 could move from Valparaiso, Indiana to Oak Lawn, Illinois and increase power from 250 watts to 1,900 watts. Its FM sister station, which had recently changed frequency to 93.7, survived to become WTRX-FM in 2003, then WJBC-FM in 2010.

References

External links
 Application Search Results for FCC facility ID 37822

Radio stations established in 1966
Radio stations disestablished in 1998
1966 establishments in Illinois
1998 disestablishments in Illinois
Defunct radio stations in the United States
POK (AM)
Pontiac, Illinois
POK
POK